McBride is a series of 10 made-for-television mystery films released by the Hallmark Channel between 2005 and 2008 and stars John Larroquette as a lawyer. It later appeared regularly on the Hallmark Movie Channel. It is broadcast some weekends on the Hallmark Drama Channel. While on the Hallmark Channel, it was broadcast in rotation with the movie series Jane Doe, Murder 101, and Mystery Woman under the umbrella title Hallmark Channel Mystery Wheel. In the UK, these movies are aired, on a rotation basis, in afternoon drama slot on Channel 5.

Story
Lawyer Mike McBride is a curmudgeon with a heart of gold. He takes cases based on their merit rather than on their monetary value, which often leads to terse notices from bill collectors. A disillusioned member of the LAPD, McBride left the force after 12 years and went back to school to become a lawyer. McBride, sidekick Phil Newberry, and McBride's former girlfriend Detective Roberta Hansen, solve crimes through investigation and research.

Main characters
Mike McBride (John Larroquette) – McBride, although a lawyer for only eight years, is renowned in Los Angeles for his tough persona and commitment to his clients. Quirky and unconventional, his methods often draw negative attention from his peers, as well as a certain measure of dread from every ADA he must face in the courtroom. Larroquette himself decided that McBride should not have a first name and resisted using even an initial. The name plate on his desk, however, says "M. McBride" and in the first movie, McBride's jury summons is briefly seen, noting that his first name is Mike. Later promos for the show also refer to him as Mike. He is more commonly known as "Mac". McBride has inherited a rundown ranch and a white dog, Jesse, from a client serving a life sentence.

Phil Newberry (Matt Lutz) –  Phil is former public defender who is fortunate enough to try a case in which McBride is a juror. Though Phil fails to convince the rest of the jury of his client's innocence, McBride's contrary vote is enough to hang the jury. Upon meeting face to face, Phil realizes he can learn much from this seasoned litigator and goes to work for McBride. Phil Newberry is often the "gadget guy", a post-modern counterpoint to McBride's old-fashioned sleuthing. In the first episode, he is revealed to have a trust fund and is willing to work without pay.

Roberta Hansen (Marta DuBois) – Roberta is a sharp-tongued homicide detective with the LAPD. She and McBride share a somewhat mysterious romantic past, but have put aside their entanglement to work together as friends. Though sometimes at odds, McBride and Roberta respect and trust one another, often coming together to solve crimes everyone else has abandoned. In later episodes, Roberta's office moves from a roomier one in the corner of the police headquarters to one closer to the middle of the station. Though it is never explained in the story, the switch was made for shooting reasons because the corner office was more difficult to light.

Films in the series
McBride: Murder Past Midnight, directed by Kevin Connor, first aired January 14, 2005
McBride: The Chameleon Murder, directed by Kevin Connor, first aired February 4, 2005.  This was the only movie sold on DVD by Hallmark Home Video.
 McBride: It's Murder, Madam, directed by Kevin Connor, first aired March 4, 2005
 McBride: The Doctor is Out ... Really Out, directed by John Larroquette, first aired June 12, 2005
 McBride: Tune in for Murder, directed by Stephen Bridgewater, first aired August 14, 2005
 McBride: Anybody Here Murder Marty?, directed by James Contner, first aired August 28, 2005
 McBride: Fallen Idol, directed by John Larroquette, first aired March 11, 2006
 McBride: Semper Fi, directed by John Larroquette, first aired January 20, 2007
 McBride: Dogged, directed by John Larroquette, first aired March 17, 2007
 McBride: Requiem, directed by Mark Griffiths, first aired May 31, 2008 (some sources and databases list it as 2006)

References

External links

2000s mystery films
American film series
American mystery films
Hallmark Channel Mystery Wheel
Hallmark Channel original films
Larry Levinson Productions
Films directed by Kevin Connor
American drama television films
2000s American films